Fort Mitchell may refer to: 

Fort Mitchell, Alabama
Fort Mitchell, Florida
Fort Mitchell, Kentucky
Fort Mitchell, Nebraska, an Army fort in service from 1864 to 1867, near present-day Scottsbluff, Nebraska
Fort Mitchell (South Carolina), an American Civil War fortification and historic site
Fort Mitchell, Virginia, an unincorporated community
Fort Mitchell Historic Site, archaeological site and park at the site of the Alabama fort of the same name

See also
Fort Mitchel (disambiguation)